Jenkins Alumona is a boxing promoter and also the incumbent chairman of the Lagos State Boxing Association. He was also a journalist, sport reporter and television presenter. He is a member of the Nigeria Institute of Marketing (NIMARK) and also the vice president of the Association of Advertising Agencies of Nigeria

Education
Alumona attended Enugu State University of Science and Technology (formerly the Anambra state university of science and technology), where he bagged his First degree in Mass communication and also the University of Lagos, where he bagged an Master of Science in Marketing

Career

Journalism
Alumona was a professional sports journalist at The Guardian newspaper, where he was assigned to cover boxing. He continued his sports reporting career at Independent Communication Network Limited (ICNL).. He was appointed as an editor of The News and also co-hosted Master Sports (a television sport show) with Paul Bassey and Chris Eseka at the Nigerian Television Authority (NTA)

Boxing Promotions
Alumona has been working to revive boxing as a sport and as a profession in Nigeria through his Flykite promotion. He is the brain behind the GOtv Boxing Night television show and is also the current chairman of the Lagos State Boxing Association

Advertising
Alumona is the vice chairman of the Association of Advertising Agencies of Nigeria (AAAN) and was reelected on 1st of August 2022 along with some other executives. He is the managing director of Flykaite productions

References 

Year of birth missing (living people)
Living people
Residents of Lagos